Songwol-dong may refer to one of the dong of cities in South Korea:

 Songwol-dong, Seoul, Jongno-gu, Seoul
 Songwol-dong, Incheon, Jung District, Incheon